The 2017 BRICS summit was the ninth annual BRICS summit, an international relations conference attended by the heads of state or heads of government of the five member states Brazil, Russia, India, China and South Africa. The summit was held in Xiamen, China, the second time the China has hosted the summit after the 2011 summit.

Participants

Participating leaders

References

2017 conferences
2017 in international relations
21st-century diplomatic conferences (BRICS)
09
Diplomatic conferences in China
September 2017 events in China
Xiamen